"Black Widower" is Series 3; Episode 21 of animated sitcom: The Simpsons.

Black Widower may also refer to:

Film and TV 
Black Widower (2006), a made-for-TV film about convicted murderer Lowell Amos
"Black Widower" (2016), Series 3; Episode 1 of New Zealand murder mystery series: The Brokenwood Mysteries (2014 – present).
"The Black Widower", Series 3; Episode 20 of the sitcom: The Wayans Bros.

Literature 
Black Widowers, a fictional men-only dining club created by Isaac Asimov for a series of mystery stories.

See also
Black Widow (disambiguation)